The Essenes (Hebrew: , Isiyim; Greek: Ἐσσηνοί, Ἐσσαῖοι, or Ὀσσαῖοι, Essenoi, Essaioi, Ossaioi) were a mystic Jewish sect during the Second Temple period that flourished from the 2nd century BCE to the 1st century CE.

The Jewish historian Josephus records that Essenes existed in large numbers; thousands lived throughout Roman Judaea. They were fewer in number than the Pharisees and the Sadducees, the other two major sects at the time. The Essenes lived in various cities but congregated in communal life dedicated to voluntary poverty, daily immersion, and asceticism (their priestly class practiced celibacy). Most scholars claim they seceded from the Zadokite priests.

The Essenes have gained fame in modern times as a result of the discovery of an extensive group of religious documents known as the Dead Sea Scrolls, which are commonly believed to be the Essenes' library. These documents preserve multiple copies of parts of the Hebrew Bible untouched from possibly as early as 300 BCE until their discovery in 1946.

The first reference to the sect is by the Roman writer Pliny the Elder (died 79 CE) in his Natural History. Pliny relates in a few lines that the Essenes possess no money, had existed for thousands of generations, and that their priestly class ("contemplatives") do not marry. Unlike Philo, who did not mention any particular geographical location of the Essenes other than the whole land of Israel, Pliny places them somewhere above Ein Gedi, next to the Dead Sea.

Josephus later gave a detailed account of the Essenes in The Jewish War, with a shorter description in Antiquities of the Jews and The Life of Flavius Josephus. Claiming firsthand knowledge, he lists the Essenoi as one of the three sects of Jewish philosophy alongside the Pharisees and the Sadducees. He relates the same information concerning piety, celibacy, the absence of personal property and of money, the belief in communality, and commitment to a strict observance of Sabbath. He further adds that the Essenes ritually immersed in water every morning – a practice similar to the use of the mikveh for daily immersion found among some contemporary Hasidim –, ate together after prayer, devoted themselves to charity and benevolence, forbade the expression of anger, studied the books of the elders, preserved secrets, and were very mindful of the names of the angels kept in their sacred writings.

Pliny, also a geographer, located them in the desert near the northwestern shore of the Dead Sea, where the Dead Sea Scrolls were discovered.

There were multiple minor subsects of the Essenes, including the Hemerobaptists, Bana'im and disputedly the Maghāriya.

Etymology 
Josephus uses the name Essenes in his two main accounts, The Jewish War 2.119, 158, 160 and Antiquities of the Jews, 13.171–2, but some manuscripts read here Essaion ("holding the Essenes in honour"; "a certain Essene named Manaemus"; "to hold all Essenes in honor"; "the Essenes").

In several places, however, Josephus has Essaios, which is usually assumed to mean Essene ("Judas of the Essaios race"; "Simon of the Essaios race"; "John the Essaios"; "those who are called by us Essaioi"; "Simon a man of the Essaios race"). Josephus identified the Essenes as one of the three major Jewish sects of that period.

Philo's usage is Essaioi, although he admits this Greek form of the original name, that according to his etymology signifies "holiness", to be inexact. Pliny's Latin text has Esseni.

Gabriele Boccaccini implies that a convincing etymology for the name Essene has not been found, but that the term applies to a larger group within Judea that also included the Qumran community.

It was proposed before the Dead Sea Scrolls were discovered that the name came into several Greek spellings from a Hebrew self-designation later found in some Dead Sea Scrolls, ʻosey haTorah, "'doers' or 'makers' of Torah". Although dozens of etymology suggestions have been published, this is the only etymology published before 1947 that was confirmed by Qumran text self-designation references, and it is gaining acceptance among scholars. It is recognized as the etymology of the form Ossaioi (and note that Philo also offered an O spelling) and Essaioi and Esseni spelling variations have been discussed by VanderKam, Goranson, and others. In medieval Hebrew (e.g. Sefer Yosippon) Hassidim "the Pious" replaces "Essenes". While this Hebrew name is not the etymology of Essaioi/Esseni, the Aramaic equivalent Hesi'im known from Eastern Aramaic texts has been suggested. Others suggest that Essene is a transliteration of the Hebrew word ḥiṣonim (ḥiṣon "outside"), which the Mishnah (e.g. Megillah 4:8) uses to describe various sectarian groups. Another theory is that the name was borrowed from a cult of devotees to Artemis in Anatolia, whose demeanor and dress somewhat resembled those of the group in Judea.

Flavius Josephus in Chapter 8 of "The Jewish War" states:

Location

According to Josephus, the Essenes had settled "not in one city" but "in large numbers in every town". Philo speaks of "more than four thousand" Essaioi living in "Palestine and Syria", more precisely, "in many cities of Judaea and in many villages and grouped in great societies of many members".

Pliny locates them "on the west side of the Dead Sea, away from the coast... [above] the town of Engeda".

Some modern scholars and archeologists have argued that Essenes inhabited the settlement at Qumran, a plateau in the Judean Desert along the Dead Sea, citing Pliny the Elder in support and giving credence that the Dead Sea Scrolls are the product of the Essenes. This theory, though not yet conclusively proven, has come to dominate the scholarly discussion and public perception of the Essenes.

Rules, customs, theology, and beliefs
The accounts by Josephus and Philo show that the Essenes led a strictly communal life—often compared to later Christian monasticism. Many of the Essene groups appear to have been celibate, but Josephus speaks also of another "order of Essenes" that observed the practice of being engaged for three years and then becoming married. According to Josephus, they had customs and observances such as collective ownership, electing a leader to attend to the interests of the group, and obedience to the orders from their leader. Also, they were forbidden from swearing oaths and from sacrificing animals. They controlled their tempers and served as channels of peace, carrying weapons only for protection against robbers. The Essenes chose not to possess slaves but served each other and, as a result of communal ownership, did not engage in trading. Josephus and Philo provide lengthy accounts of their communal meetings, meals, and religious celebrations. This communal living has led some scholars to view the Essenes as a group practicing social and material egalitarianism.

After a three-year probationary period, new members would take an oath that included a commitment to practice piety to God and righteousness toward humanity; maintain a pure lifestyle; abstain from criminal and immoral activities; transmit their rules uncorrupted; and preserve the books of the Essenes and the names of the angels. Their theology included belief in the immortality of the soul and that they would receive their souls back after death. Part of their activities included purification by water rituals which was supported by rainwater catchment and storage. According to the Community Rule, repentance was a prerequisite to water purification.

Ritual purification was a common practice among the peoples of Judea during this period and was thus not specific to the Essenes. A ritual bath or mikveh was found near many synagogues of the period continuing into modern times. Purity and cleanliness was considered so important to the Essenes that they would refrain from defecation on the Sabbath.

According to Joseph Lightfoot, the Church Father Epiphanius (writing in the 4th century CE) seems to make a distinction between two main groups within the Essenes: "Of those that came before his [Elxai, an Ossaean prophet] time and during it, the Ossaeans and the Nasaraeans."Part 18 Epiphanius describes each group as following:

We do not know much about the canon of the Essenes, and what their attitude was towards the apocryphal writings, however the Essenes perhaps did not esteem the book of Esther highly as manuscripts of Esther are completely absent in Qumran, likely because of their opposition to mixed marriages and the use of different calendars.

The Essenes were unique for their time for being against the practice of slave-ownership, and slavery, which they regarded as unjust and ungodly, regarding all men as having been born equal.

Scholarly discussion 

Josephus and Philo discuss the Essenes in detail. Most scholars believe that the community at Qumran that most likely produced the Dead Sea Scrolls was an offshoot of the Essenes. However, this theory has been disputed by some; for example, Norman Golb argues that the primary research on the Qumran documents and ruins (by Father Roland de Vaux, from the École Biblique et Archéologique de Jérusalem) lacked scientific method, and drew wrong conclusions that comfortably entered the academic canon. Golb's book presents observations about de Vaux's premature conclusions and their uncontroverted acceptance by the general academic community. He states that the documents probably stemmed from various libraries in Jerusalem, kept safe in the desert from the Roman invasions. Other scholars refute these arguments—particularly since Josephus describes some Essenes as allowing marriage.

Another issue is the relationship between the Essaioi and Philo's Therapeutae and Therapeutrides. He regarded the Therapeutae as a contemplative branch of the Essaioi who, he said, pursued an active life.

One theory on the formation of the Essenes suggests that the movement was founded by a Jewish high priest, dubbed by the Essenes the Teacher of Righteousness, whose office had been usurped by Jonathan (of priestly but not of Zadokite lineage), labeled the "man of lies" or "false priest". Others follow this line and a few argue that the Teacher of Righteousness was not only the leader of the Essenes at Qumran, but was also identical to the original Messianic figure about 150 years before the time of the Gospels. Fred Gladstone Bratton notes that
 Lawrence Schiffman has argued that the Qumran community may be called Sadducean, and not Essene, since their legal positions retain a link with Sadducean tradition.

Relation to Christianity 

Rituals of the Essenes and Christianity have much in common; the Dead Sea Scrolls describe a meal of bread and wine that will be instituted by the messiah, both the Essenes and Christians were eschatological communities, where judgement on the world would come at any time. The New Testament also possibly quotes writings used by the Qumran community. Luke 1:31-35 states " And now you will conceive in your womb and bear a son and you will name him Jesus. He will be great and will be called the son of the Most High...the son of God" which seems to echo 4Q 246, stating: "He will be called great and he will be called Son of God, and they will call him Son of the Most High...He will judge the earth in righteousness...and every nation will bow down to him".

Other similarities include high devotion to the faith even to the point of martyrdom, communal prayer, self denial and a belief in a captivity in a sinful world.

John the Baptist has also been argued to have been an Essene, as there are numerous parallels between John's mission and the Essenes, which is why he perhaps was trained by the Essene community.

In the early church a book called the Odes of Solomon was written. The writer was likely a very early convert from the Essene community into Christianity. The book reflects a mixture of mystical ideas of the Essene community with Christian concepts.

Both the Essenes and the Christians used concepts of "light" and "darkness" for good and evil.

Both the Essenes and Christians practiced voluntary celibacy and prohibited divorce.

A few have argued that the Essenes had an idea of a pierced Messiah based on 4Q285, however the interpretation of the text is ambiguous, some scholars interpreted it as the Messiah being killed himself, while modern scholars mostly interpret it as the Messiah executing the enemies of Israel in an eschatological war.

Both the Essenes and Christians practiced a ritual of immersion by water, however the Essenes had it as a regular practice instead of a one time event.

Relation to Mandaeism 

The Haran Gawaita uses the name Nasoraeans for the Mandaeans arriving from Jerusalem meaning guardians or possessors of secret rites and knowledge. Scholars such as Kurt Rudolph, Rudolf Macúch, Mark Lidzbarski and Ethel S. Drower connect the Mandaeans with the Nasaraeans described by Epiphanius, a group within the Essenes according to Joseph Lightfoot. Epiphanius says (29:6) that they existed before Christ. That is questioned by some, but others accept the pre-Christian origin of the Nasaraeans.

Early religious concepts and terminologies recur in the Dead Sea Scrolls, and Yardena (Jordan) has been the name of every baptismal water in Mandaeism. One of the names for the Mandaean God Hayyi Rabbi, Mara d-Rabuta (Lord of Greatness) is found in the Genesis Apocryphon II, 4. Another early self-appellation is bhiri zidqa meaning 'elect of righteousness' or 'the chosen righteous', a term found in the Book of Enoch and Genesis Apocryphon II, 4. As Nasoraeans, Mandaeans believe that they constitute the true congregation of bnai nhura meaning 'Sons of Light', a term used by the Essenes. Mandaean scripture affirms that the Mandaeans descend directly from John the Baptist's original Nasoraean Mandaean disciples in Jerusalem. Similar to the Essenes, it is forbidden for a Mandaean to reveal the names of the angels to a gentile. Essene graves are oriented north–south and a Mandaean's grave must also be in the north–south direction so that if the dead Mandaean were stood upright, they would face north. Mandaeans have an oral tradition that some were originally vegetarian and also similar to the Essenes, they are pacifists.

The beit manda (beth manda) is described as biniana rab ḏ-srara ("the Great building of Truth") and bit tuslima ("house of Perfection") in Mandaean texts such as the Qolasta, Ginza Rabba, and the Mandaean Book of John. The only known literary parallels are in Essene texts from Qumran such as the Community Rule, which has similar phrases such as the "house of Perfection and Truth in Israel" (Community Rule 1QS VIII 9) and "house of Truth in Israel."

Comparison 
Comparison of the Jewish sects:

See also 
 Hellenistic Judaism
 Jewish vegetarianism
 Sacred Mysteries
 Sons of Zadok

References

Further reading

 
 
 
 
 
 
 
 
 
 
 
 
 
 
 
 
 
 
 
 
 
 
 
 
 
 
 Vermes, Geza; Goodman, Martin. The Essenes According to the Classical Sources. JSOT on behalf of the Oxford Centre for Postgraduate Hebrew Studies: Sheffield, 1989.

External links

 Catholic Encyclopedia: Essenes
 Jewish Encyclopedia: Essenes
 Essenes and Others: argues that the Hebrew original form of the name later spelled "Essenes" is in some Qumran scrolls as a self-designation.
 "Jannaeus, His Brother Absalom, and Judah the Essene" Stephen Goranson, identities of Wicked Priest and Teacher of Righteousness, relevant to history of the Essenes
 Thematically compiled comparison of the parallels in the ancient sources
 The Digital Dead Sea Scrolls/ Essenes

Apocalyptic groups
Esoteric schools of thought
Ascetics
Jewish asceticism
Jewish religious movements
Judaism-related controversies
Messianism
Mandaeism
Mandaeans
Israelites
2nd-century BCE Judaism
1st-century BCE Judaism
1st-century Judaism
Extinct religious groups